The 2008 African Volleyball Championship U19 was the tenth edition of the African Volleyball Championship U19. It was held in Cairo, Egypt, from December 21 to December 25, 2008. The top three teams will qualify for the 2009 Youth World Championship.

Teams

Competition system
The competition system of the 2008 African Championship U19 is the single Round-Robin system. Each team plays once against each of the 4 remaining teams. Points are accumulated during the whole tournament, and the final ranking is determined by the total points gained.

Championship

|}

Results
All times are Egypt Standard Time (UTC+02:00).

|}

Final standing

Team Roster
Hatem Obba, Ibrahim Besbes, Mohamed Ayech, Saddem Hmissi, Mohamed Arbi Ben Abdallah, Bahri Ben Massoud, Mahdi Sammoud, Mohamed Ali Ben Othmen Miladi, Ali Ben Abdallah, Racem Siala, Sadam Ben Daoud, Khalil Bouazizi
Head Coach: Lotfi Ben Slimane

Awards
MVP:  Ibrahim Besbes
Best Spiker:  Innocent Irdukunda
Best Blocker:  Mohamed Khatab
Best Server:  Ahmed Elkotb
Best Setter:  Mahdi Sammoud
Best Receiver:  Saddem Hmissi

References

External links
Official website

African Volleyball Championship U19
African Volleyball Championship U19
African Volleyball Championship U19
International volleyball competitions hosted by Egypt
African Volleyball Championships
African Volleyball Championship U19